Royal Air Force Woodchurch or more simply RAF Woodchurch is a former Royal Air Force Advanced Landing Ground located in Kent, England.

Opened in 1943, Woodchurch was a prototype for the type of temporary Advanced Landing Ground type airfield which would be built in France after D-Day, when the need for advanced landing fields would become urgent as the Allied forces moved east across France and Germany.  It was used by the Royal Air Force and the United States Army Air Forces.  It was closed in September 1944.

Today the airfield is a mixture of agricultural fields with no recognizable remains.

History

The following units were here at some point:
 No. 128 Airfield RAF
 No. 231 Squadron RAF
 No. 400 Squadron RCAF
 No. 414 Squadron RCAF
 No. 2809 Squadron RAF Regiment

The USAAF Ninth Air Force required several temporary Advanced Landing Ground (ALG) along the channel coast prior to the June 1944 Normandy invasion to provide tactical air support for the ground forces landing in France.

USAAF use
While under USAAF control, Woodchurch was known as USAAF Station AAF-419 for security reasons, and by which it was referred to instead of location.   Its Station-ID was "WC".

373rd Fighter Group 
In the first week of April 1944, the 373d Fighter Group arrived from Richmond Army Air Base, Virginia operating Republic P-47 Thunderbolts.  Operational fighter squadrons and fuselage codes were:
 410th Fighter Squadron (R3)
 411th Fighter Squadron (U9)
 412th Fighter Squadron (V5)

The 373d Fighter Group was part of the 303d Fighter Wing, XIX Tactical Air Command.

Movement to France took place in late July and most of the personnel and aircraft had left for Tour-en-Bessin (ALG A-13) by the 31st.

Woodchurch did not miss out as a haven for disabled bombers. On 29 June, a 458th Bomb Group Liberator landed without its nosewheel down, causing irreparable damage to the aircraft and urgent work for the runway repair crew, and another ailing B-24 put down safely on 19 July.

Current use
The area was fully returned to agriculture by the following year.   Today, there is no physical evidence of the airfield, as the land has been redeveloped into either agricultural fields or meadows. The only way which the location of RAF Woodchurch can be determined is by comparing the road network on aerial photos of the airfield when it was active to the road network today. However, a privately owned airstrip does run parallel to the original main runway (01 - 19) and some evidence of the original dispersal standings can be seen from the air.

See also

List of former Royal Air Force stations

References

Citations

Bibliography

 Freeman, Roger A. (1994) UK Airfields of the Ninth: Then and Now 1994. After the Battle 
 Freeman, Roger A. (1996) The Ninth Air Force in Colour: UK and the Continent-World War Two. After the Battle 
 Maurer, Maurer (1983). Air Force Combat Units of World War II. Maxwell AFB, Alabama: Office of Air Force History. .
 USAAS-USAAC-USAAF-USAF Aircraft Serial Numbers--1908 to present

External links

 Aerial Photo of RAF Woodchurch from Multimap.Com

Airfields of the IX Fighter Command in the United Kingdom
Royal Air Force stations in Kent